Enteromius humilis is a species of ray-finned fish in the genus Enteromius. It is endemic to Ethiopia.

Footnotes 
 

Enteromius
Fish of Ethiopia
Endemic fauna of Ethiopia
Taxa named by George Albert Boulenger
Fish described in 1902